Publius Aelius Fortunatus was a Roman painter.

His name became known due to his epitaph in the city of Rome. He was a freedman – a libertus – and lived in the 2nd century CE.

Literature 
 Günther Bröker, "Adymos", Rainer Vollkommer: Künstlerlexikon der Antike, Nikol, Hamburg 2007, p. 4, 

2nd-century Romans
2nd-century painters
Ancient Roman painters
Fortunatus, Publius